Mark Steven Johnson (born October 30, 1964) is an American filmmaker.

Life and career
Johnson began his career writing the Warner Bros. films Grumpy Old Men and its sequel Grumpier Old Men. Johnson wrote and directed two comic book based films Daredevil and Ghost Rider as well as the film Simon Birch. Johnson also wrote the story for the film Christopher Robin and directed the Netflix film Love, Guaranteed. Most recently Johnson wrote and directed Love in the Villa also for Netflix.

Filmography

Executive producer
 Elektra (2005)
 Ghost Rider: Spirit of Vengeance (2011)
 Finding Steve McQueen (2019)

References

External links

Mark Steven Johnson at Rotten Tomatoes

1964 births
American male screenwriters
California State University, Long Beach alumni
Living people
People from Hastings, Minnesota
Film directors from Minnesota
Film producers from Minnesota
Screenwriters from Minnesota